Carole Ann Hodges (married name Carole Cornthwaite; born 1 September 1959) is an English former cricketer who played as a right-handed batter and right-arm off break bowler. She appeared in 18 Test matches and 47 One Day Internationals for England between 1982 and 1993. She was part of the England team that won the 1993 World Cup, and took the first ever WODI hattrick in England's first game of the tournament, against Denmark. Her final WODI appearance was in the final of the 1993 Women's Cricket World Cup. She played domestic cricket for Lancashire and Cheshire.

References

External links
 

1959 births
Living people
Sportspeople from Blackpool
England women One Day International cricketers
England women Test cricketers
Lancashire and Cheshire women cricketers
Women's One Day International cricket hat-trick takers